Medog (in Tibetan) or Motuo (in Chinese) may refer to:

 Mêdog County, a county in Tibet
 Mêdog (village), a village in Tibet